The  is a skyscraper located in Kōriyama, Fukushima Prefecture, Japan. Construction of the 133-metre, 24-storey skyscraper was finished in 2001.

External links

  

Buildings and structures completed in 2001
Kōriyama
Skyscrapers in Japan
Buildings and structures in Fukushima Prefecture
2001 establishments in Japan
Glass architecture